Jeevan Pramaan is a Life Certificate program affiliated with Aadhaar for people with pensions. It was started by Prime Minister Narendra Modi on 10 November 2014.

The certificate was made for people who receive pensions from central or state governments or other government organisations.

Jeevan Pramaan was made by the Department of Electronics and IT, Government of India.

The Jeevan Pramaan software can be downloaded from https://jeevanpramaan.gov.in/ for both PC and Android devices. Alternatively this process can be carried out at one of the many Jeevan Pramaan Centres. An electronic Jeevan Praaman certificate can be obtained by a pension beneficiary using this software with a fingerprint or iris scan, using the Aadhaar platform for authentication. The certificate can then be made available electronically to the Pension Disbursing Agency.

Eastern Railway launched a Jeevan Pramaan Centre to facilitate the pensioners at Zonal Headquarter at Fairlie Place, Kolkata on 6 August 2015. The service will be extended to additional divisions, workshops and other major establishments under the jurisdiction of Eastern Railway.

References

E-government in India
Pensions in India
Public-key cryptography
Modi administration initiatives
Digital India initiatives